Die Sterne is a two/three/four-piece indie pop band, from Hamburg, Germany. They were formed in 1991 and have released twelve studio albums, the most recent in 2022.

Members

The band consists of Frank Spilker (vocals and guitar), Thomas Wenzel (bass and vocals), and Christoph Leich (drums). Frank Will and Richard von der Schulenburg were both former keyboarders for the band.
Thomas Wenzel is also a member of the bands Die Goldenen Zitronen and Cow, while keyboardist Richard von der Schulenburg and singer Frank Spilker pursue their own solo projects. In 2018 the two co-founders Christoph Leich und Thomas Wenzel left the band.

Discography

Studio albums
Wichtig (1993)
In echt (1994)
Posen (1996), peaked at position #64 on the German Music Charts
Von allen Gedanken schätze ich doch am meisten die interessanten (1997), #43
Wo ist hier (1999), #27
Irres Licht (2002), #36
Das Weltall ist zu weit (2004), #70
Räuber und Gedärm (2006), #58
24/7 (2010), #61
Für Anfänger (2012, mini-album)
Flucht in die Flucht (2014), #43
Die Sterne (2020)
Hallo Euphoria (2022)

Compilation albums
Stell die Verbindung her (1998)
Die Interessanten: Singles 1992-2004 (2005)

Singles
Ein verregneter Sommer (1987)
In Einer Nacht Wie Dieser (1988)
Fickt das System (1992)
Universal Tellerwäscher (1994)
Was hat dich bloß so ruiniert (1996)
Trrrmer (1996)
Trrrmer-Remixe (1996)
Unter Geiern II (1996)
Widerschein (1996)
Themenläden Remixe 1 (1997)
Themenläden Remixe 2 (1997)
Swinging Safari (1997)
Die Interessanten (1997)
Abstrakt (1997)
Bis neun bist du O.K. (1997)
Big in Berlin (1999)
Das bißchen besser (1999)
Nur Flug (2002)
Wenn dir St. Pauli auf den Geist fällt (2002)
Gerechtes Brett (2003)
In diesem Sinn (2004)

References

External links

 

Culture in Hamburg
Musical groups from Hamburg
Musical groups established in 1991